Ride Out for Revenge is a 1957 American Western film directed by Bernard Girard and starring Rory Calhoun, Gloria Grahame, Lloyd Bridges and Joanne Gilbert.

Plot
Chief Yellow Wolf and son Little Wolf walk to town (the plight of Yellow Wolf's tribe is so dire they walked to town to save their horses) to meet with army Captain George (Bridges) to seek provisions for the upcoming winter. He wants the Indians relocated off of their own land. He pretends to be interested in Yellow Wolf's offer of living together in peace, then his man Garvin murders him in the street. George protests he had only instructed his man to "rough up" Chief Yellow Wolf.

Marshal Tate (Calhoun) sides with the tribe and also is in love with Yellow Wolf's daughter, Pretty Willow. His attitude disgusts George, who demands the marshal turn in his badge. Tate does so willingly and tells his nephew Billy it is time they move to another town. Amy Porter (Grahame), a widow who runs the boardinghouse and loves Tate, tells him she cannot abide his feelings for an Indian woman instead.

After ignoring Tate's warnings that there will be reprisals, George panics when they attack. At first be pleads with Tate for help in killing Little Wolf, then conspires with lies to turn Little Wolf and the Indian natives against Tate, claiming he has selfish motives. Pretty Willow turns against Tate after being convinced he plans to kill her brother.

Angry with his uncle and trying to sneak away, the boy Billy is killed. Tate and Little Wolf end up in a knife fight, while Amy, now regretting her prejudice, takes in Pretty Willow at her home. Capt. George believes he has the situation under control, until Tate turns up alive and well and takes matters into his own hands.

Cast
 Rory Calhoun as Tate
 Gloria Grahame as Amy Porter
 Lloyd Bridges as Capt. George
 Joanne Gilbert as Pretty Willow
 Vince Edwards as Chief Little Wolf
 Richard Shannon as Garvin
 Frank DeKova as Chief Yellow Wolf
 Michael Winkelman as Billy
 Cyril Delevanti as Preacher

External links
Ride Out for Revenge at TCMDB

Ride Out for Revenge at New York Times

1957 films
United Artists films
1957 Western (genre) films
Bryna Productions films
American Western (genre) films
Films directed by Bernard Girard
Films scored by Leith Stevens
1950s English-language films
1950s American films